The dalton or unified atomic mass unit (symbols: Da or u) is a non-SI unit of mass widely used in physics and chemistry. The atomic mass constant, denoted mu, is defined identically, giving .

This unit is commonly used in physics and chemistry to express the mass of atomic-scale objects, such as atoms, molecules, and elementary particles, both for discrete instances and multiple types of ensemble averages. This is an intrinsic property of the isotope and all helium-4 atoms have the same mass. However, there are no acetylsalicylic acid molecules with this mass.

The molecular masses of proteins, nucleic acids, and other large polymers are often expressed with the units kilodaltons (kDa), megadaltons (MDa), etc. Titin, one of the largest known proteins, has a molecular mass of between 3 and 3.7 megadaltons.

The mole is a unit of amount of substance, widely used in chemistry and physics, which was originally defined so that the mass of one mole of a substance, measured in grams, would be numerically equal to the average mass of one of its constituent particles, measured in daltons. That is, the molar mass of a chemical compound was meant to be numerically equal to its average molecular mass. For example, the average mass of one molecule of water is about 18.0153 daltons, and one mole of water is about 18.0153 grams. However, while this equality can be assumed for almost all practical purposes, it is now only approximate, because of the way mole was redefined on 20 May 2019.

In general, the mass in daltons of an atom is numerically close but not exactly equal to the number of nucleons contained in its nucleus. It follows that the molar mass of a compound (grams per mole) is numerically close to the average number of nucleons contained in each molecule. By definition, the mass of an atom of carbon-12 is 12 daltons, which corresponds with the number of nucleons that it has (6 protons and 6 neutrons). However, the mass of an atomic-scale object is affected by the binding energy of the nucleons in its atomic nuclei, as well as the mass and binding energy of its electrons. Therefore, this equality holds only for the carbon-12 atom in the stated conditions, and will vary for other substances. In general, the difference (absolute mass excess) is less than 0.1%; exceptions include hydrogen-1 (about 0.8%), helium-3 (0.5%), lithium-6 (0.25%) and beryllium (0.14%). 

The dalton differs from the unit of mass in the atomic units systems, which is the electron rest mass (me).

Energy equivalents
The atomic mass constant can also be expressed as its energy-equivalent, muc2. The 2018 CODATA recommended values are:

The megaelectronvolt mass-equivalent (MeV/c2) is commonly used as a unit of mass in particle physics, and these values are also important for the practical determination of relative atomic masses.

History

Origin of the concept

The interpretation of the law of definite proportions in terms of the atomic theory of matter implied that the masses of atoms of various elements had definite ratios that depended on the elements.  While the actual masses were unknown, the relative masses could be deduced from that law.  In 1803 John Dalton proposed to use the (still unknown) atomic mass of the lightest atom, that of hydrogen, as the natural unit of atomic mass.  This was the basis of the atomic weight scale.

That proposal was formally adopted by the International Committee on Atomic Weights (ICAW) in 1903. That was approximately the mass of one hydrogen atom, but oxygen was more amenable to experimental determination. This suggestion was made before the discovery of the existence of elemental isotopes, which occurred in 1912. The physicist Jean Perrin had adopted the same definition in 1909 during his experiments to determine the atomic masses and the Avogadro constant. This definition remained unchanged until 1961. Perrin also defined the "mole" as an amount of a compound that contained as many molecules as 32 grams of oxygen. He called that number the Avogadro number in honor of physicist Amedeo Avogadro.

Isotopic variation
The discovery of isotopes of oxygen in 1929 required a more precise definition of the unit. Unfortunately, two distinct definitions came into use.

Definition by the IUPAC

Moreover, it was discovered that the isotopes of oxygen had different natural abundances in water and in air. For these and other reasons, in 1961 the International Union of Pure and Applied Chemistry (IUPAC), which had absorbed the ICAW, adopted a new definition of the atomic mass unit for use in both physics and chemistry; namely,  of the mass of a carbon-12 atom. This new value was intermediate between the two earlier definitions, but closer to the one used by chemists (who would be affected the most by the change).

The new unit was named the "unified atomic mass unit" and given a new symbol "u", to replace the old "amu" that had been used for the oxygen-based units. However, the old symbol "amu" has sometimes been used, after 1961, to refer to the new unit, particularly in lay and preparatory contexts.

These values, generally used in chemistry, are based on averages of many samples from Earth's crust, its atmosphere, and organic materials.

Adoption by the BIPM

The IUPAC 1961 definition of the unified atomic mass unit, with that name and symbol "u", was adopted by the International Bureau for Weights and Measures (BIPM) in 1971 as a non-SI unit accepted for use with the SI.

Unit name
In 1993, the IUPAC proposed the shorter name "dalton" (with symbol "Da") for the unified atomic mass unit. As with other unit names such as watt and newton, "dalton" is not capitalized in English, but its symbol, "Da", is capitalized. The name was endorsed by the International Union of Pure and Applied Physics (IUPAP) in 2005.

In 2003 the name was recommended to the BIPM by the Consultative Committee for Units, part of the CIPM, as it "is shorter and works better with [the SI] prefixes". In 2006, the BIPM included the dalton in its 8th edition of the formal definition of SI. The name was also listed as an alternative to "unified atomic mass unit" by the International Organization for Standardization in 2009. It is now recommended by several scientific publishers, and some of them consider "atomic mass unit" and "amu" deprecated. In 2019, the BIPM retained the dalton in its 9th edition of the formal definition of SI while dropping the unified atomic mass unit from its table of non-SI units accepted for use with the SI, but secondarily notes that the dalton (Da) and the unified atomic mass unit (u) are alternative names (and symbols) for the same unit.

2019 redefinition of the SI base units 
The definition of the dalton was not affected by the 2019 redefinition of SI base units, that is, 1 Da in the SI is still  of the mass of a carbon-12 atom, a quantity that must be determined experimentally in terms of SI units. However, the definition of a mole was changed to be the amount of substance consisting of exactly  entities and the definition of the kilogram was changed as well. As a consequence, the molar mass constant is no longer exactly 1 g/mol, meaning that the number of grams in the mass of one mole of any substance is no longer exactly equal to the number of daltons in its average molecular mass.

Measurement
Although relative atomic masses are defined for neutral atoms, they are measured (by mass spectrometry) for ions: hence, the measured values must be corrected for the mass of the electrons that were removed to form the ions, and also for the mass equivalent of the electron binding energy, Eb/muc2. The total binding energy of the six electrons in a carbon-12 atom is  = : Eb/muc2 = , or about one part in 10 million of the mass of the atom.

Before the 2019 redefinition of SI units, experiments were aimed to determine the value of the Avogadro constant for finding the value of the unified atomic mass unit.

Josef Loschmidt

A reasonably accurate value of the atomic mass unit was first obtained indirectly by Josef Loschmidt in 1865, by estimating the number of particles in a given volume of gas.

Jean Perrin
Perrin estimated the Avogadro number by a variety of methods, at the turn of the 20th century. He was awarded the 1926 Nobel Prize in Physics, largely for this work.

Coulometry

The electric charge per mole of elementary charges is a constant called the Faraday constant, F, whose value had been essentially known since 1834 when Michael Faraday published his works on electrolysis. In 1910, Robert Millikan obtained the first measurement of the charge on an electron, −e.  The quotient F/e provided an estimate of the Avogadro constant.

The classic experiment is that of Bower and Davis at NIST, and relies on dissolving silver metal away from the anode of an electrolysis cell, while passing a constant electric current I for a known time t. If m is the mass of silver lost from the anode and A the atomic weight of silver, then the Faraday constant is given by:

The NIST scientists devised a method to compensate for silver lost from the anode by mechanical causes, and conducted an isotope analysis of the silver used to determine its atomic weight.

Electron mass measurement
In practice, the atomic mass constant is determined from the electron rest mass me and the electron relative atomic mass Ar(e) (that is, the mass of electron divided by the atomic mass constant). The relative atomic mass of the electron can be measured in cyclotron experiments, while the rest mass of the electron can be derived from other physical constants.

where c is the speed of light, h is the Planck constant, α is the fine-structure constant, and R∞ is the Rydberg constant.

As may be observed from the old values (2014 CODATA) in the table below, the main limiting factor in the precision of the Avogadro constant was the uncertainty in the value of the Planck constant, as all the other constants that contribute to the calculation were known more precisely.

The power of the presently defined values of universal constants can be understood from the table below (2018 CODATA).

X-ray crystal density methods

Silicon single crystals may be produced today in commercial facilities with extremely high purity and with few lattice defects. This method defined the Avogadro constant as the ratio of the molar volume, V, to the atomic volume V:

where  and n is the number of atoms per unit cell of volume Vcell.

The unit cell of silicon has a cubic packing arrangement of 8 atoms, and the unit cell volume may be measured by determining a single unit cell parameter, the length a of one of the sides of the cube.

The isotope proportional composition of the sample used must be measured and taken into account. Silicon occurs in three stable isotopes (28Si, 29Si, 30Si), and the natural variation in their proportions is greater than other uncertainties in the measurements. The atomic weight A for the sample crystal can be calculated, as the standard atomic weights of the three nuclides are known with great accuracy. This, together with the measured density ρ of the sample, allows the molar volume V to be determined:

where M is the molar mass constant.

See also 

 Mass (mass spectrometry)
 Kendrick mass
 Monoisotopic mass
 Mass-to-charge ratio

Notes

References

External links
Atomic weights and isotopic compositions
 atomic mass unit at sizes.com

Metrology
Nuclear chemistry
Units of chemical measurement
Units of mass